Domenica is a 1952 French drama film directed by Maurice Cloche and starring Odile Versois, Jean-Pierre Kérien and Albert Dinan. It was shot entirely on location in Corsica.

Cast
 Odile Versois as Domenica Léandri 
 Jean-Pierre Kérien as Giuseppe Léandri 
 Albert Dinan as Carlo 
 Alain Quercy as Patrice 
 Janine Zorelli as La Colombani

References

Bibliography 
 Crisp, C.G. The Classic French Cinema, 1930-1960. Indiana University Press, 1993

External links 
 

1952 films
1952 drama films
French drama films
1950s French-language films
Films shot in Corsica
Films set in Corsica
Films directed by Maurice Cloche
French black-and-white films
1950s French films